Abul Fazl Shrine (Pashto/) is a shrine and mosque, located in Murad Khane, Kabul, Afghanistan.

The facility was hit with a massive blast on 21 February 2023.

See also 
 2011 Afghanistan Ashura bombings
 List of mosques in Afghanistan

References 

Shia mosques in Afghanistan